Ali Zafar  (born 18 May 1980) is a Pakistani singer-songwriter, model, actor, producer, screenwriter and painter. He started out on Pakistani television before becoming a popular musician, later also established a career in Bollywood and his success led many Pakistani actors to venture into Hindi films. He has received five Lux Style Awards and a Filmfare Award nomination.

Zafar started his career as a music composer and gained popularity with his single "Channo" from his debut album Huqa Pani, which sold over five million copies worldwide. "Channo" turned out to be a huge success, topping many music charts and earned him several awards for Best Music Album and Artist. Zafar made his acting debut with a leading role in the 2010 Bollywood satire film Tere Bin Laden, a moderate box office success. His performance in the film garnered critical appreciation and earned him several nominations in the Best Male Debut category, including Filmfare. He then also worked in several films, including Mere Brother Ki Dulhan, Chashme Baddoor, and Dear Zindagi.

Alongside his acting and singing career, Zafar participates in tours, concerts and stage shows, is active in humanitarian work and has a number of endorsement deals. In 2013, Zafar was voted as the "Sexiest Asian Man on the Planet", based on a worldwide poll by the British newspaper Eastern Eye.

On 23 March 2021, Ali Zafar was awarded the highest literary award, Pride of Performance, for his meritorious contribution and achievements in the field of arts and music. He received the award from President of Pakistan Arif Alvi at ceremony at the President House, Islamabad.

Early life

Ali Zafar was born on 18 May 1980 in Lahore, Punjab, Pakistan to a Punjabi family. His parents, Mohammad Zafarullah and Kanwal Ameen, were professors at the University of Punjab. He has two brothers, Zain and Danyal; the latter of these is a commercial model who aimed to launch a career as a singer and actor soon. Zafar received his early education from C.A.A. Public School. He graduated from the Government College of Lahore and the National College of Arts.

Career
Zafar started his career as a sketch artist at Pearl Continental Hotel in Lahore and then began acting in television serials. He debuted as a television actor by acting in drama serials Kollege Jeans, Kanch Ke Par and Landa Bazar.

Zafar sang "Jugnuon Se Bhar De Aanchal" for the 2003 film Shararat. In the same year, he debuted as a musician with the album Huqa Pani, which was a success. The album sold over 5,000,000 copies worldwide and won several awards and nominations, including the 2004 Lux Style Award for "Best Album" and the 2008 "Best Male Artist" award at the MTV awards, making him one of the most popular pop singers in Pakistan. It was also claimed that Bollywood's popular music directors Himesh Reshammiya and Pritam ripped "Channo" and "Rangeen" from Zafar's album in "Chhore Ki Baatein" for Fight Club – Members Only and "Dillagi Mein Jo Beet Jaaye" for Aashiq Banaya Aapne respectively.

Zafar released his second album Masty in November 2006. The music video of the single "Dekha" was named as the most expensive music video of Pakistan, costing more than ten million rupees. The video was produced by Lux and was shot in Malaysia, featuring Reema Khan, Meera and Aaminah Haq. The song was also made part of the Hollywood film Wall Street: Money Never Sleeps, which was released in September 2010. He is currently the fourth Pakistani artist after Nusrat Fateh Ali Khan, Strings and Atif Aslam to have songs featured in Hollywood films. He also won the "Youth Icon" award in the Lux Style Awards 2007, in Malaysia. Zafar was also offered a role for 2007 film Khuda Kay Liye, but was unable to sign due to some personal reasons. The role was then performed by Fawad Khan.

In 2010, he made his debut as a leading actor with the Bollywood film Tere Bin Laden, which was directed by Abhishek Sharma. Tere Bin Laden was partially based on Osama Bin Laden and Zafar played a Pakistani journalist from Karachi, who makes fake video of Osama Bin Laden, so that he could go to America. The film released in July 2010, proved to be a major commercial success in India, but was banned in Pakistan. Zafar's performance in the film garnered critical appreciation and earned him Best Male Debut nominations at several award ceremonies, including IIFA Awards, Screen Awards, Zee Cine Awards and Filmfare Awards. He was also named as the first Pakistani to be called to Indian Film Festival at Australia in March 2011 for his movie screening.

In February 2011, Zafar released his third album Jhoom, which won the 2012 Lux Style Award for "Best Music Album". He made a special appearance in the film Luv Ka The End, in which he sang a song, "F.U.N. Fun Funna". He also sung the title song for the film Love Mein Ghum. He also acted alongside Tara D'Souza in the film Mere Brother Ki Dulhan, starring Imran Khan and Katrina Kaif, and it was released in September 2011.

In March 2012, Zafar starred in the film London, Paris, New York with Aditi Rao Hydari. It was directed by Anu Menon, and Zafar also composed the soundtrack for the film. He also performed the soundtrack for the Pakistani drama Zindagi Gulzar Hai, which won many awards.

Zafar also starred in the romantic comedy film Chashme Baddoor, directed by David Dhawan. The film was released in April 2013 and was declared a box office super-hit. The same year, he was also featured in an episode of Burka Avenger, singing his famous song "Channo".
Zafar then also starred in and composed the soundtrack for the film Total Siyappa, which was a romantic comedy film released in March 2014. He also acted in Kill Dil, which was released in November.

Zafar released a single "Urain Ge" as tribute to victims of APS Peshawar attack in early 2015, featuring many Pakistani artists. His voice was also featured in the song "DJ", which was sung by Sunidhi Chauhan for the film Hey Bro. He then also sang a song for Defence Day, "Hanstay Hanstay".

Zafar had performed an item number "Six Pack Abs" in the sequel of his 2010 film Tere Bin Laden, entitled Tere Bin Laden: Dead or Alive, which was released in February 2016. Zafar was also seen in Pakistani film Lahore Se Aagey. He then appeared in Gauri Shinde's Dear Zindagi as a musician alongside the star cast Alia Bhatt. The films were released in November 2016. He then also sung "Hum Roshan to Kal Roshan", which released in December 2016.

In 2018, Zafar starred in Ahsan Rahim's directorial debut romantic action-comedy film Teefa in Trouble, alongside Maya Ali, which is debut of both the actors in Lollywood, and also the debut of Zafar's Lightingale Productions. He is also working on his fourth music album, and he will be producing another Pakistani film based in Deosai National Park.

Tours and performances

After he got fame, Zafar first performed at the ceremony of 3rd Lux Style Awards in 2004. The following year, he did his stage act at 4th Lux Style Awards. He then sang live the songs in 5th Lux Style Awards in 2006 and 6th Lux Style Awards in 2007, and then performed a stage dance with Reema Khan in the 2007 ceremony. He also had performed in Mela Festival at Oslo, Norway in 2008.

He joined Coke Studio Pakistan in 2008 and performed three original songs "Allah Hu", "Daastan-e-Ishq" and "Nahi Ray Nahi", and one tribute song "Yaar Daddi Ishq" to Muhammad Juman, in season one and two.

In 2012, Zafar performed at 11th Lux Style Awards with Humaima Malick and also paid tribute to musician Mehdi Hassan by singing his ghazal "Mujhe Tum Nazar Sai". He also performed at the Pantaloons Femina Miss India contest held at Bhavans Ground in Mumbai on 30 March 2012. He then performed at GiMA Awards. He also had performed at 57th Filmfare Awards, but his performance was cut out in the TV release. In 2013, he performed along with Shah Rukh Khan, Katrina Kaif and Preity Zinta at Temptations Reloaded concert in Muscat, Oman.

Zafar then also performed in the Lifestyle Pakistan Expo at Karachi Expo Centre, where he walked the ramp for designer brand ChenOne and also performed with a dhol. He was also invited to perform in 2013 Cannes Film Festival held at Cannes, France. In 2014, he was seen performing with Yami Gautam on Zee Cine Awards. He then also performed in Naz Choudhury's Bollywood Showstoppers at The O2 Arena along with Sonakshi Sinha, Jacqueline Fernandez, Mika Singh and Shahid Kapoor. He then also hosted the first Star Box Office India Awards Ceremony along with Ayushmann Khurrana, where they also gave a musical tribute to Raj Kapoor.

He re-joined Coke Studio Pakistan in 2015 for the eight season where he performed three songs. The first song "Rockstar" became popular worldwide, and was also appreciated by Imran Khan, Mahira Khan, Sonu Nigam, Hrithik Roshan and Adnan Sami, and then it was also awarded the title Song of the Year. Zafar then gave tribute to Saleem Raza by performing a second song "Ae Dil" along with Sara Haider. The third song he performed was Sufi "Ajj Din Vehre Vich".

At the logo-launch-event of Pakistan Super League on 20 September 2015, Zafar released and performed on the league anthem "Ab Khel Ke Dikha". He also performed in the launch event of the team Islamabad United on 30 January 2016, where he released team anthem "Chakka Choka". He then also performed in the opening ceremony of 2016 PSL on 4 February. He also performed about 50 concerts across Pakistan within two months in early 2016.

Zafar performed a dancing act on the remix of his Coke Studio hit "Rockstar" in the ceremony of 14th Lux Style Awards, after when he was given musical tribute by Jimmy Khan, Uzair Jaswal, Sara Haider and Farhan Saeed separately, in 2015. The following year, he hosted the ceremony, where he performed an opening dance act on his new song paying tribute to Lux Style Awards. He then also gave a musical tribute there, co-singing with Ali Sethi and Qurat-ul-Ain Balouch, to Amjad Sabri who was assassinated in Karachi on 22 June 2016.

The same year, he collaborated with Atif Aslam for the song "Yaarian", and they performed on it on Defence Day. Zafar walked the ramp in September with Mahira Khan, showcasing the bridal collection in Divani's Bagh-e-Bahar show, at the Haveli Barood Khana. He also performed on the stage of 1st Hum Style Awards along with Sohai Ali Abro, where he was also awarded "Most Stylish Male Performer". In his concert on 25 November, he performed the mannequin challenge too.

Zafar released anthem of 2017 PSL "Ab Khel Jamay Ga" in January 2017, upon which he then also performed in its opening ceremony on 9 February in Dubai, and also at its closing ceremony on 5 March in Gaddafi Stadium, Lahore. He also performed at grand finale of Miss Veet in January. On 19 April, he along with his Teefa in Trouble co-star Maya Ali, performed in the 16th Lux Style Awards.

In tenth season of Coke Studio Pakistan, Zafar performed four songs, after being featured in the promo song "Qaumi Taranah". He performed his original "Julie" alongside his brother Danyal Zafar on guitars under Shani Arshad's production, and "Yo Soch" with Natasha Khan under Strings production. He also gave tribute to Master Inayat Hussain by performing "Jaan-e-Bahaaraan" solo under Shuja Haider's production, and to Junaid Jamshed by "Us Rah Par" with Ali Hamza ft. Strings under Jaffer Zaidi's production.

On 27 October 2017, Zafar performed at the MTV Unplugged India concert with Ayushmann Khurrana at Dubai Tennis Stadium.

Personal life
Zafar married his long-time fiancée Ayesha Fazli, who is a distant relative of Indian actor Aamir Khan, on 28 July 2009 in Lahore, Pakistan. They had a boy in 2010, and a girl in 2015.

His brother-in-law Umair Fazli is a movie director, better known for making the 2016 box office success Saya e Khuda e Zuljalal.

Sexual harassment allegations 

On 19 April 2018, fellow singer Meesha Shafi accused Ali Zafar of sexual harassment on Twitter. Ali Zafar categorically denied the allegation and said that he would take the matter to court. On 23 June 2018, Ali Zafar filed a 1 billion rupees defamation case against Shafi for slander under the Defamation Ordinance 2002, claiming that Shafi had caused "tremendous injury" to his "reputation, goodwill, livelihood" through "false, slanderous and defamatory" allegations, according to Geo News. The suit read: "As the defamatory statements are patently false, it can only be concluded that this malicious campaign has been launched against the plaintiff as part of a motivated conspiracy to tarnish the plaintiff's good image through making false accusations."

On 25 June 2018, Court issued "a permanent stay against Meesha Shafi until the final decision of the case", preventing her making further claims against Zafar. Meesha had filed a complaint to the provincial Ombudsperson under the Protection Against Harassment of Women at Workplace Act 2010, which was dismissed on 3 May 2018. Meesha filed an appeal against the order of the Ombudswoman to the Governor of Punjab who also dismissed her appeal, on the grounds that Meesha Shafi was not an employee at the time. On 10 April 2019, the court fined Meesha Shafi Rs. 10,000 over "non-appearance" of her lawyer.

On 29 April 2019, Shafi described how she had first tried to resolve her complaint privately with Zafar's representatives, but Zafar insisted she visit him. On 30 May 2019, nine eyewitnesses, including two women, denied Shafi's allegations of harassment. Kanza Muneer said in her statement that during the rehearsal, at which 11 people were present and videos were made, Zafar and Shafi maintained five to six feet distance from each other. On 11 October 2019, Lahore High Court dismissed Meesha Shafi's appeal.

In his testimony in court Ali Zafar said that he supports the #MeToo movement, which is aimed to end sexual harassment and abuse, but it had been "misused against him". Zafar claimed that it was actually Shafi's lawyer, a renowned women's rights activist who was the master mind behind the conspiracy. "Meesha Shafi's claim in her court testimony that the other women who came forward are unrelated is a complete lie. Our findings exposed that they were deeply interlinked much before the allegations. The common link seems to be Nighat Dad. They were all either working with or for her," Ali Zafar said in his testimony while presenting evidence.

On 6 July 2019, lawyer Hassan Niazi in his tweets alleged Shafi's lawyer, Nighat Dad's NGO deleted its audit report and had foreign funding.

Ali Zafar also filed a criminal case of cybercrime in the Federal Investigation Agency (FIA) and tweeted:

Ali Zafar claimed that a social media campaign was launched against him through fake accounts and allegations, proof of which he submitted in his complaint to the FIA Cyber Crime Department. Many such accounts and Facebook pages in support of Shafi were instantly deleted when Zafar highlighted them on social media.

On December 16, 2020, Federal Investigation Agency (FIA) Cyber Crime Wing found Meesha Shafi and 8 others guilty of running a defamatory drive on social media against Ali Zafar damaging his reputation.
In January 2021 the Supreme Court admitted Meesha Shafi’s plea against the dismissal of her appeal

Filmography

Films

Pakistani cinema

Hindi cinema

Television

Appearance in television commercials

Close-Up (toothpaste)
Telenor Pakistan
Tarang Tea Whitener
Pepsi
Lipton
Lay's
Mobilink
LG Mobile KG195
Nokia
QMobile
Sunlight washing powder
Sprite (drink)
Samsung Galaxy J1 Ace
Yamaha YBR125
Nestlé Fruta Vitals
Diamond Supereme Foam
Royal Fans
Good Goodies
Kashmir Cooking Oil & Banaspati
Tecno Mobile Pakistan
Zong 4G
Dabur OxyLife Men Bleach Crème (India)

Other appearances
Music video of "Preeto Mere Naal", by Abrar ul Haq

Discography

Awards and nominations

See also
 List of Bollywood films
 List of Indian playback singers
 Music of Pakistan
 History of Pakistani pop music
 List of Pakistani actors

References

Notes

External links

 
 

Bollywood playback singers
Male actors in Hindi cinema
Living people
National College of Arts alumni
Pakistani male film actors
Pakistani film producers
Pakistani electronic musicians
Pakistani playback singers
Pakistani folk singers
Pakistani male models
21st-century Pakistani male singers
Pakistani pop singers
Pakistani male singer-songwriters
Performers of Sufi music
Punjabi-language singers
Punjabi people
Government College University, Lahore alumni
Urdu-language singers
Urdu playback singers
Pakistani male television actors
Musicians from Lahore
Beaconhouse School System alumni
Male actors in Urdu cinema
Recipients of the Pride of Performance
 
1980 births